Unaccustomed as We Are is a short comedy film produced by Hal Roach and directed by Lewis R. Foster. It was released by Metro-Goldwyn-Mayer on May 4, 1929. This picture was the first "all-talking" Laurel and Hardy comedy. The working title was Their Last Word. The title was changed to Unaccustomed as We Are, a play on the familiar phrase "Unaccustomed as I am to public speaking..."

Story
Oliver Hardy brings his friend Stan Laurel home to dinner, as a surprise guest. Mrs. Hardy (Mae Busch) is sick and tired of cooking for her husband's lowlife pals and, after giving Mr. Hardy a piece of her mind, she walks out. Left to his own devices, Hardy resolves to cook the dinner himself. He pauses to assist a friendly neighbor (Thelma Todd), and when Laurel's blundering spoils the dinner plan, Todd volunteers to help. Unfortunately Laurel has unwittingly started a fire in the kitchen, and Todd's clothes are ruined. She can't return to her own apartment because her jealous husband, a policeman (Edgar Kennedy), has just arrived. Desperate, she hides inside a trunk in Hardy's living room. Suddenly Mrs. Hardy returns, contrite, but Hardy tries to get rid of the trunk by pretending to walk out himself. Officer Kennedy sends Mrs. Hardy out of the room and tries to settle matters peacefully -- until he finds out who's hiding in the trunk.

Production
The new talking-picture technology was so unfamiliar at the Roach studio that Unaccustomed as We Are became a training exercise for its technical staff. Four cameramen alternated on the photography. The film was also released in a silent version, to accommodate those theaters that had not yet converted to sound. Unaccustomed as We Are was an experiment in sound, and most of the action was driven by dialogue. The silent version had printed title cards displaying the dialogue whenever anyone spoke, resulting in a slow and sometimes tedious narrative. Later Laurel and Hardy hybrids, intended for both silent and sound markets, were careful to include pantomime and visual gags, so silent-film audiences could enjoy the action without hearing the dialogue.

References

1929 films
Metro-Goldwyn-Mayer films
Laurel and Hardy